Igor Andreev was the defending champion, but did not compete this year.

Nikolay Davydenko won in the final 6–4, 5–7, 6–4 against Marat Safin.

Seeds

Draw

Finals

Top half

Bottom half

External links
 2006 Kremlin Cup Draw
 2006 Kremlin Cup Qualifying Draw

Kremlin Cup
Kremlin Cup